North Motton is a rural locality and town in the local government area of Central Coast, in the North West region of Tasmania. The 2016 census determined a population of 405 for the state suburb of North Motton.

History
Land in the area was occupied by William Motton in 1854. The locality was gazetted in 1962.

Geography
The River Leven forms part of the south-western boundary, flows through from south-west to north-west, and then forms much of the northern boundary.

Road infrastructure
The B17 route (Preston Road) enters from the north-east and runs through to the south as Gunns Plains Road before exiting. Route C125 (a continuation of Preston Road) starts at an intersection with B17 and runs south before exiting.

Prominent residents
 Paul O'Halloran, former Australian politician

See also
 Murder of Chrissie Venn, unsolved 1921 crime

References

Localities of Central Coast Council (Tasmania)
Towns in Tasmania